In many countries, dialing either 1-1-2 (used in Europe and parts of Asia) or 9-1-1 (used in the Americas) will connect callers to the local emergency services. Some countries use other emergency telephone numbers, sometimes also depending on the emergency service. The emergency numbers in the world (but not necessarily all of them) are listed below:

Africa

Antarctica

Asia

Europe

Oceania

Central America

Caribbean

North America

South America

See also

 000 – emergency number in Australia
 100 – emergency number in India, Greece and Israel
 106 – emergency number in Australia for textphone/TTY
 108 – emergency number in India (22 states)
  – emergency number mainly in China, Japan, Taiwan
 111 – emergency number in New Zealand
 112 – emergency number across the European Union and on GSM mobile networks across the world
 119 – emergency number in Jamaica and parts of Asia
 122 – emergency number for specific services in several countries
 911 – emergency number in North America and the Philippines
 999 – emergency number in many countries

Explanatory notes

References